It's Christmas is the Christmas album of singer, Ledisi. The album peaked #28 on the Top R&B charts. This is Ledisi's second release on Verve Forecast. This Christmas was released as the lead single and Children Go Where I Send Thee was released as the second single of the album.

Promotion
On December 7, 2008, Ledisi's Christmas show entitled Ledisi Christmas aired on the Gospel Music Channel. Ledisi Christmas aired a 30-minute show. Ledisi and Anibade performed a selection of the following songs: Children Go Where I Send Thee, Thank You, This Christmas, Alright, and Have Yourself a Merry Little Christmas. The show aired several times during the month of December.

Track listing
"I'll Go"
"Children Go Where I Send Thee"
"Give Love on Christmas Day"
"Be There for Christmas"
"This Christmas (Could Be the One)"
"Have Yourself a Merry Little Christmas"
"What Are You Doing New Year's Eve?"
"It's Christmas"
"What a Wonderful World"
"Please Come Home for Christmas"
"Silent Night"
"Thank You"

Charts

References

Ledisi albums
2008 Christmas albums
Christmas albums by American artists
Verve Forecast Records albums